Belper is a civil parish in the Amber Valley district of Derbyshire, England.  The parish contains over 250 listed buildings that are recorded in the National Heritage List for England.  Of these, one is listed at Grade I, the highest of the three grades, 15 are at Grade II*, the middle grade, and the others are at Grade II, the lowest grade.  The parish contains the town of Belper, the village of Milford, smaller settlements, including Makeney and Bargate, and the surrounding countryside.  Industry has been a major feature in the town, initially with nail making, and some workshops have survived and are listed.  Major industry arrived towards the end of the 18th century when Jedediah Strutt and Richard Arkwright built a textile mill in the town.  Later, Arkwright moved away, and more mills were built by Strutt, and later by his sons.  North Mill was built in 1804 by William Strutt, it was one of the first iron-framed and fireproof mills to be built, and is listed at Grade I.  The Strutt family built housing for their workers in Belper and Milford, usually in the form of long terraces, many of which have survived and are listed.  The family also built farms to produce food for the community, including Crossroads Farm, Dalley Farm, Wyver Farm, and Moscow Farm; the farmhouses and associated farm buildings are listed.

Between 1835 and 1840 the North Midland Railway built a line through the centre of the town which passed through a deep cutting.  The series of bridges crossing the line in the town and to the south are listed.  Also, to the south, the line passed through Milford Tunnel; the portals of the tunnel and a tower built during its construction are listed.   The River Derwent passes through the parish, and the listed buildings associated with it are bridges, weirs and sluices.  Within the town and villages, most of the listed buildings are houses, cottages and associated structures, shops, churches, chapels and associated items, public houses and hotels, industrial buildings, some of which have been converted for other uses, schools, and public buildings.  The other listed buildings in the town and villages include almshouses, a former workhouse, later a hospital, cemetery buildings, a drinking fountain, a bandstand, war memorials, and telephone kiosks.  Outside the urban areas, the listed buildings include farmhouses and farm buildings, a former toll house, a milestone, and a former firing range.


Key

Buildings

References

Citations

Sources

 

Lists of listed buildings in Derbyshire
L